Arizona Bushwhackers is a 1968 American Western film directed by Lesley Selander and starring Howard Keel, Yvonne de Carlo, John Ireland, Marilyn Maxwell, Scott Brady and Brian Donlevy.

Plot
During the American Civil War, a Confederate spy takes a job as marshal of a small western town as a cover for his espionage activities. However, he soon finds out that a local businessman is selling weapons to a band of rampaging Indians.

Cast
 Howard Keel as Lee Travis
 Yvonne De Carlo as Jill Wyler
 John Ireland as Deputy Dan Shelby
 Marilyn Maxwell as Molly
 Scott Brady as Tom Rile
 Brian Donlevy as Mayor Joe Smith
 Barton MacLane as Sheriff Grover
 James Craig as Ike Clanton
 Roy Rogers Jr. as Roy 
 Regis Parton as Curly (as Red Parton)
 Montie Montana as Stage Driver
 Eric Cody as Bushwhacker - Ed Jones

References

External links
 

1968 films
Films directed by Lesley Selander
1968 Western (genre) films
American Western (genre) films
Films scored by Jimmie Haskell
Paramount Pictures films
American Civil War films
1960s English-language films
1960s American films